Vivian Fernández de Torrijos (born Vivian del Carmen Fernández Bello on March 25, 1966) became the First Lady of Panama on September 1, 2004, when she married President Martín Torrijos, serving in that post until he left office as president on July 1, 2009.

External links 
Reporters Vivian Torrijos abre agencia publicitaria
Vivian de Torrijos abre Tribu DDB en Panamá
Vivian de Torrijos, en exclusiva

|-

1966 births
Living people
First ladies and gentlemen of Panama
People from Panama City